Patty Contreras is an American politician. She is a Democratic member of the Arizona House of Representatives elected to represent District 12 in 2022. She is one of the first out lesbians elected to the Arizona House of Representatives. Contreras was serves on the health and human services and transportation and infrastructure committees. She retired from the city of Phoenix, Arizona where she worked for 31.5 years as a program manager in human services and parks and recreation.

References

External links 

 
 Biography at Ballotpedia

Democratic Party members of the Arizona House of Representatives
Living people
Year of birth missing (living people)
21st-century American women politicians
Women state legislators in Arizona
Hispanic and Latino American state legislators in Arizona
21st-century American politicians
21st-century LGBT people
Lesbian politicians
LGBT state legislators in Arizona
Hispanic and Latino American women in politics
LGBT Hispanic and Latino American people